"Grace" is a song by French recording artist Miss Kittin. It is the second and final single from her fourth studio album BatBox (2008).  Co-written and produced by Pascal Gabriel, it is composed as an electropop love song.

Critical reception
Quentin B. Huff of Resident Advisor commented that the song too effectively follows the pattern of "talk-rap over tight beats and haunting synthesizers."

Cultural impact
In 2008, the song was featured on the compilation album Switch 12 by PIAS, which charted at number four on the Belgian (Flanders) Compilation Albums Chart.

Track listing
 "Grace (Sleeparchive Remix)" - 6:18	 
 "Grace (Original)" - 3:23	 
 "Grace (Martinez Bass In Your Face Mix)" - 9:35

References

2008 songs
2008 singles
Miss Kittin songs
Songs written by Pascal Gabriel
Songs written by Miss Kittin
Electroclash songs